Maecha Bora was a political party in the Comoros.

History
The party had ministers in the government formed by President Said Mohamed Djohar on 6 January 1992. In the March 1992 parliamentary elections it finished fourth in the popular vote, winning three seats in the Assembly of the Union. However, the party failed to win a seat in the early elections the following year.

In 1996 Maecha Bora was one of several parties that merged to form the National Rally for Development.

References

Defunct political parties in the Comoros
Political parties disestablished in 1996
1996 disestablishments in the Comoros